Kevin McLaverty (24 October 1936 – 6 December 2002) was an Irish sailor. He competed in the Finn event at the 1972 Summer Olympics.

References

External links
 

1936 births
2002 deaths
Irish male sailors (sport)
Olympic sailors of Ireland
Sailors at the 1972 Summer Olympics – Finn
Place of birth missing